Josie Dwyer is a camogie player, winner of All-Ireland Senior medals  in 2010 and 2011 She famously delivered the pass to Ursula Jacob which secured the 2011 All Ireland title for Wexford. She was an All-Star nominee in 2010.

Other awards
National Camogie League medals in 2009, 2010 and 2011; National League Division one 2010, 2009; Leinster Championship 2004, 2009, 2010, 2011; Leinster Junior 2004, 2003; Leinster Under-16 2000; Leinster Under-16 2000; Leinster Junior 2003, 2004; Leinster Senior colleges with FCJ Bunclody) 2000; Club Junior 1998; Club Intermediate 2000; Purple and Gold Star 2008. Dwyer re-joined the squad in 2010 for the first time since 2006. Her brother, Tommy, has played with Wexford in all grades of hurling. She has played football with the county at all levels, including the All Ireland Intermediate final of 2007. A member of the Garda Siochana, she is based in Arklow town.

References

External links
 Camogie.ie Official Camogie Association Website
 Wexford Wexford camogie site

1984 births
Living people
Wexford camogie players